Gold Diggers: The Secret of Bear Mountain is a 1995 American adventure film directed by Kevin James Dobson, and starring Christina Ricci, Anna Chlumsky, Polly Draper, Brian Kerwin, Diana Scarwid, and David Keith. Set in 1980 in the Pacific Northwest, the film follows two teenaged girls who, inspired by a local legend, attempt to recover a fortune of gold inside a mountain.

Plot
In June 1980, teenager Beth Easton and her recently widowed mother, Kate, relocate from Los Angeles to the small town of Wheaton, Washington, where they move into Kate's aunt's farmhouse. Initially, Beth misses the city and resents her new surroundings. In town she encounters Jody Salerno, a troubled but free-spirited teenager who has a bad reputation. While riding her bike the next day, Beth is forced off the road by a pickup truck and plummets down a steep ravine, crashing her bicycle into a river, where Jody is fishing.

Kate attempts to ingratiate Beth with two local girls, Tracy and Samantha. While they are picking berries at the house, Beth encounters Jody, who has been hiding in a tree and throwing cherries at them. Tracy and Samantha warn Beth against associating with Jody, but Beth joins her on a trek through the woods. Beth and Jody quickly become friends, and Jody tells Beth she has an adventure planned for the following day, the summer solstice. When Jody fails to meet Beth that morning, local cop Matt Hollinger offers her a ride to Jody's house. Jody's mother, Lynette, answers the door, appearing shaken and inebriated, and tells Beth that Jody is not home.

Matt brings Beth home and realizes that he is an old acquaintance of her mother. Beth receives a phone call from Jody, who directs her into the forest outside her house. She explains that she hid from Matt and Beth because she had broken in and stolen candy from the vending machines in the local high school; she then tells Beth the story of Molly Morgan, a female miner who purportedly died in a mine collapse in Bear Mountain while searching for gold. The girls board a motorized boat which Jody has hidden along the river, and ride downstream and into the mountain, where she has set up a makeshift living space in the cavern entryway. When Beth notices Jody's bandaged shoulder, Jody confesses that Lynette and her abusive boyfriend, Ray, had gotten into a fight the night before, and that Jody may have fatally wounded him after he chased her into the woods. Beth urges Jody to go to the police, but she refuses, planning to hide out in the mountain.

As a rainstorm approaches, the girls attempt to leave the cave, but a rock collapse occurs that damages the boat and pins Beth to the cave floor. Jody swims out of the cave and down the river, making it safely past a grizzly bear and to a road where she crosses paths with a State trooper. Beth is rescued just in time, as the water level has slowly risen inside the cave. At the hospital, Jody is confronted by Ray, who is still alive to the surprise of Jody and Beth.

Kate forbids Beth to spend time with Jody, but she appears at a Fourth of July picnic and divulges her plan to return to the mountain to get the gold. Kate eventually decides to let Beth see Jody, and they drive to Jody's house the next day. Inside, they find the house trashed and Lynette, beaten and incoherent, and no sign of Ray or Jody. Lynette is taken to the hospital and Beth insists to Matt that they go to the mountain, believing that Ray took Jody there. Beth assists Matt to the caves, but the two are separated inside. Beth finds Jody, who tells her that a drunken Ray beat her and forced her to take him to find the gold.

Beth goes back to find Matt, and Jody is grabbed from behind by whom she believes is Ray—when she turns around, she finds it is an elderly woman, who then recedes into the shadows. Ray appears and attempts to grab Jody, but is hit over the head with a shovel by the elderly woman. Beth returns to find Jody and Ray, unconscious, but the old woman—ostensibly Molly Morgan—has disappeared. Matt finally finds Beth and Jody and Ray is arrested. Lynette recovers in the hospital and Jody accepts her apologies.

In late August, Matt arrives at Beth's house, and brings her, Kate, Jody, and Lynette to the courthouse, where an attorney is representing an anonymous client who has bestowed a gift to the girls. They are given two bags, each containing gold, and are cheered and applauded by the town citizens, including Tracy and Samantha.

Cast

Production
Though (erroneously thought to be) set in Oregon, the film was primarily shot in British Columbia, Canada, in the cities of Nelson and Pemberton. It was also shot in JANAF Shopping Center in Norfolk, Virginia.

This would be the first of two 1995 films to feature actresses Christina Ricci and Ashleigh Aston Moore, as they appeared the following month in Now and Then, a similarly nostalgic coming of age film.

Release
Gold Diggers: The Secret of Bear Mountain was released theatrically in the United States on November 3, 1995.

Critical reception
Stephen Holden of The New York Times wrote: "Any movie that encourages young girls to be wilderness adventurers rather than boy-crazed babes-in-waiting certainly has its heart in the right place. That's why it's sad to report that Gold Diggers: The Secret of Bear Mountain, a movie about two friends who impulsively trek through the Washington State rain forest in search of a mythical cache of gold, is a pallid, halfhearted affair." Leonard Klady of Variety gave the film a similarly middling assessment, writing that "while director Kevin James Dobson has a feel for natural location, too often one simply can’t fathom how characters have traveled from one location to the next. Remaining tech credits are top-notch but cannot compensate for the script’s myriad inconsistencies and laughable plot twists. The picture has struck a rich vein that only the greenest of movie prospectors would fail to recognize as pyrites." Jack Garner of the Democrat and Chronicle wrote that the film "has been directed in adequate but lackluster style by Australian Kevin James Dobson. He works well with his juvenile stars, but doesn't have much of a flair for action sequences."

Marjorie Baumgarten of The Austin Chronicle alternately praised Ricci and Chlumsky's performances, and called the film a "a better-than-average kid's picture." The Washington Posts Hal Hinson praised the film, writing: "Though Australian director Kevin James Dobson keeps his audience involved in the dangerous task of recovering the gold, the real essence of the movie lies in the rapport between these best friends. Screenwriter Barry Glasser does a superb job of entering the world of young girls on the verge of becoming women. Or, perhaps, it's just that these two exceptional actresses make him look good. As the movie unfolds, the adventure plot and the intensifying drama back home intertwine nicely, and very much to the benefit of both."

Kevin Thomas of the Los Angeles Times described the film as "intelligent entertainment enlivened with first-rate performances all around... Cinematographer Ross Berryman captures the grandeur of the film’s setting, but at times Joel McNeely’s grandiose score threatens to overwhelm this unpretentious picture. It’s a testament to the film’s sturdiness that it survives McNeely’s unintended efforts to drown it." Roger Ebert gave the film two-and-a-half stars, noting: "Gold Diggers is not my cup of tea, but it is sure to be enjoyed by younger audiences, and although I don't think it will hold the attention of adults, I do not require adults and children to be alike in all things."

Home media
Gold Diggers: The Secret of Bear Mountain was released on VHS by MCA/Universal Home Video in 1996.

On November 24, 2009, Universal Pictures Home Entertainment released the film in made-on-demand DVD-R format as part of the Universal Vault Series. In 2017, Universal released the film for the first time on DVD.

The film was released on Blu-ray by Mill Creek Entertainment on March 9, 2021.

References

External links
 
 

1995 films
American adventure drama films
English-language Canadian films
Fictional duos
Films about child abuse
Films about runaways
Films directed by Kevin James Dobson
Films produced by Martin Bregman
Films scored by Joel McNeely
Films set in 1980
Films set in Oregon
Films shot in British Columbia
Films about mining
Treasure hunt films
Universal Pictures films
1990s English-language films
1990s female buddy films
1990s American films